Paul Thalmann may refer to:

 Paul Thalmann (anarchist) (1901–1980)
 Paul Thalmann (footballer) (1884–?)